Lampung University is a public university in Bandar Lampung, Lampung, Indonesia. It was established on September 22, 1965. Its rector is Prof. Dr. Karomani, M.Si.

History
The college was started because high school graduates in Lampung were going to Java or Palembang to continue their studies. The college was realised by two committees :
 Committee Establishment and Expansion of Secondary School which turned into a Committee Establishment and Expansion of Secondary School and Faculty headed by Ahmad Farhan.
 Preparatory Committee for the Establishment of Higher Education Foundation Lampung chaired by Prof. Sulaksana Hasan Rabbani. The two committees merged into the Foundation Trustees College of Lampung. The foundation was formed with faculties of Economics, Law, and Social.

Faculties
The university has eight faculties in bachelor's degree:
 Faculty of Agriculture
 Faculty of Social and Political Sciences
 Faculty of Economics
 Faculty of Education
 Faculty of Law
 Faculty of Mathematic and Natural Sciences
 Faculty of Medicine
 Faculty of Engineering

Postgraduate
The education program, which has been established since 1999, has 27 courses spread over eight faculties:
 Environmental Science
 Management,
 Economic Sciences
 Law
 Educational Technology
 Management Education
 Social Science Education
 Indonesian Language and Literature Education
 Agronomy
 Agribusiness
 Agro-Industry Technology
 Forestry
 Natural Resource Management
 Civil Engineering
 Governance
 Administrative Science
 Chemistry
 Biology
 Mathematics

Then in 2014:
 Physics
 Food Technology
 Community Development
 Language and Literature Education
 Elementary School Teaching
 Science Teaching
 Agricultural Extension and Communication
 Mechanical Engineering

Rector 
2019-2023 Prof. Dr. Karomani, M.Si.

2015-2019 Prof. Dr. Hasriadi Mat Akin, M.P.

2011-2015 Prof. Dr. Ir. Sugeng Prayitna Harianto, M.S.

2007-2011

2003-2007

References

External links
 http://www.unila.ac.id/

Bandar Lampung
Universities in Lampung
Indonesian state universities
Educational institutions established in 1965
1965 establishments in Indonesia